Myagrus is a genus of longhorn beetles of the subfamily Lamiinae, containing the following species:

 Myagrus alboplagiatus (Gahan, 1888)
 Myagrus hynesi Pascoe, 1878
 Myagrus irroratus (Heller, 1924)
 Myagrus javanicus Breuning, 1957
 Myagrus vinosus (Pascoe, 1866)

References

Lamiini
Cerambycidae genera